Jacques Baudet-Lafarge (1803–1867) was a French politician. He served as a member of the National Assembly from 1848 to 1849, representing Puy-de-Dôme.

References

1803 births
1867 deaths
People from Puy-de-Dôme
Politicians from Auvergne-Rhône-Alpes
Members of the 1848 Constituent Assembly